Divalá is a corregimiento in Alanje District, Chiriquí Province, Panama. Its population as of 1990 was 5,673; its population as of 2000 was 6,256.

References

Corregimientos of Chiriquí Province